Enrique Adolfo Jiménez Brin (8 February 1888 – 28 April 1970) was President of Panama from 15 June 1945 to 7 August 1948, representing the National Liberal Party of Panama.

Jiménez Brin was appointed private secretary of President Belisario Porras Barahona at the age of 25, deputy Minister of State, president of the National Bank of Panama and ambassador of Panama to the United States at Washington, D.C., an important post due to the authority exercised by the U.S. over Panama due to its ownership of the Panama Canal.

He was elected the first presidential designate by the National Assembly for the 1924–1926 term and a second time for the 1934–1936 term.

In June 1945, he was appointed president of the Republic of Panama by the Constituent National Assembly, and remained in office until 7 August 1948.

Achievements
During his term in office, Jiménez's achievements included:
 Tocumen International Airport was constructed
 The Colón Free Trade Zone was created
 The Felix Olivares school in Chiriquí Province and Abel Bravorew school in Colón were established
 The School of Mechanical Currency Arts was created
 New buildings for the Artes y Oficos school were added
 Legislation supporting education and university autonomy were written
 Promoted commercial development, such as the university city and the Hotel El Panama (which later became the Panama Hilton)

Among his notable books are:
  (Political Reminiscences)
 For History and Memories

Significance to Panama
 He is patriarch of one Panama's most recognized and honorable families, who remain involved in politics
 Enrique Adolfo Jiménez Airport in Colón, Panama was named for him

References

1888 births
1970 deaths
Presidents of Panama
Vice presidents of Panama
National Liberal Party (Panama) politicians
Ambassadors of Panama to the United States